This is a list of food and beverage museums. Food museums, beverage museums and wine museums generally provide information about how various foodstuffs are produced or were historically produced. Many of these museums are owned and operated by specific food and beverage production companies.

Food and beverage museums

A
 Aghdam Bread Museum, Agdam, Azerbaijan
 Agricultural Museum, Cairo, Egypt
 Agropolis, Montpellier, France (closed 2010—operating a website only)
 Aigle Castle, Aigle, Switzerland
 American Institute of Baking, Manhattan, Kansas, US
 Alimentarium, Vevey, Switzerland

B
 Beer Can Museum, East Taunton, Massachusetts, US
 Biedenharn Museum and Gardens, Monroe, Louisiana, US
 Bochnia Salt Mine, Bochnia, Poland
 Bramah Tea and Coffee Museum, London, England, UK (closed 2008 – operating a website only)
 Bully Hill Vineyards, Hammondsport, New York, US
 Burlingame Museum of Pez Memorabilia, Burlingame, California, US
 Museum of Russian Bread, Moscow, Russia

C

 Cadbury World, Birmingham, England, UK and Dunedin, New Zealand
 California Citrus State Historic Park, Riverside, California, US
 Candy Americana Museum, Lititz, Pennsylvania, US
 Cantillon Brewery, Anderlecht, Brussels, Belgium
 Centro Cultural la Azotea, Jocotenango, Guatemala
 China National Tea Museum, Hangzhou, China
 Choco-Story, Bruges, Belgium
 Chocolate Museum (New Brunswick), St. Stephen, New Brunswick, Canada
 Cider Museum, Nava, Spain
 Coca-Cola Museum, Taoyuan City, Taiwan
 Copia, Napa, California, US (closed 2008)
 Cyprus Wine Museum, Erimi, Cyprus

D

 Demel, Vienna, Austria
 Desmond Castle, Kinsale, Ireland
 Deutsches Brauereimuseum, Munich, Germany
 Dole Plantation, Wahiawa, Hawaii, US
 Dr Pepper Museum, Waco, Texas, US

E
 Ethnographic Museum of Dairy, La Foz, Spain
 European Bread Museum, Ebergötzen, Germany

F
 Frietmuseum, Bruges, Belgium
 Frietmuseum, Merchtem, Belgium (intended 2006–2008). The whole collection went to Bruges.

G

 German Salt Museum, Lüneburg, Germany
 Gingerbread Museum, Toruń, Poland
 Goa Chitra Museum, Benaulim, India
 Gourmet Museum and Library, Hermalle-sous-Huy, Belgium
 Guinness Storehouse, Dublin, Ireland

H
 Hallein Salt Mine, Hallein, Austria
 Halloren Chocolate Factory, Halle (Saale), Germany
 Hallors and Saline Museum, Halle (Saale), Germany
 Harland Sanders Café and Museum, North Corbin, Kentucky, US
 Hatakeyama Memorial Museum of Fine Art, Tokyo, Japan
 Heineken Experience, Amsterdam, Netherlands
 Hershey's Chocolate World, Hershey, Pennsylvania, US
 Honey Museum, Yunlin, Taiwan
 Hook Norton Brewery, Hook Norton, England, UK
 Hotel and Restaurant Museum, Helsinki, Finland

I

 Idaho Potato Museum, Blackfoot, Idaho, US
 Imhoff-Schokoladenmuseum, Cologne, Germany
 International Museum of Wine, Kinsale, Ireland

J
 Jack Daniel Distillery, Lynchburg, Tennessee, US
 Jell-O Gallery, Le Roy, New York, US
 Jelly Belly Candy Company factory, Fairfield, California, US
 Julita Abbey, Oppunda Hundred, Sweden

K

 Khewra Salt Mine, Khewra, Pakistan
 Kilbeggan Distillery, Kilbeggan, Ireland
 Kimchi Field Museum, Seoul, South Korea
 Kuo Yuan Ye Museum of Cake and Pastry, Taiwan

L
 Lion Salt Works, Marston, Cheshire, England, UK
 Lithuanian Museum of Ancient Beekeeping, Stripeikiai, Lithuania

M

 M&M's World, Las Vegas, Nevada, US 
 Macau Wine Museum, Macau, China
 The Chios Mastic Museum, Pyrgi, Chios, Greece
 Maritime & Seafood Industry Museum, Biloxi, Mississippi, US 
 Marzipan Museum, Szentendr, Hungary
 Mikulov Castle, Mikulov, Czech Republic
 Momofuku Ando Instant Ramen Museum, Ikeda, Osaka, Japan
 Musée "Les secrets du chocolat", Geispolsheim, France
 Musée Chappuis-Fähndrich, Develier, Switzerland
 Musée du Vin, Paris, France
 Museo del vino (Torgiano), Torgiano, Italy
 Museo dell'olivo e dell'olio, Torgiano, Italy
 Museu de la Xocolata, Barcelona, Spain
 Museum of cacao and chocolate, Brussels, Belgium
 Museum of Chocolate (Pokrov), Pokrov, Vladimir Oblast, Russia
 Museum of Drinking Water, Taipei, Taiwan
 Museum of Food and Drink, Brooklyn, US
 Museum of the Olive and Greek Olive Oil, Sparta, Greece
 Museum of Pasta, Collecchio, Parma, Italy
 Museum of Spirits, Stockholm, Sweden
 Museum of Sugar, Recife, Brazil (closed 1977)
 Museum of Tea Ware, Hong Kong, China
 Museum of Tomato, Collecchio, Parma, Italy

N

 Nantwich Museum, Nantwich, England, UK
 National Brewery Centre, Burton upon Trent, England, UK
 National Coffee Park, Quindío Department, Colombia
 National Dairy Shrine, Fort Atkinson, Wisconsin, US
 National Museum of Agriculture in Szreniawa, Szreniawa, Poland
 National Museum of Pasta Foods, Rome, Italy
 National Mustard Museum, Middleton, Wisconsin, US

O
 Oldest McDonald's restaurant, Downey, California, US
 Onondaga Lake Park, Liverpool, New York, US
 Oscar Getz Museum of Whiskey History, Bardstown, Kentucky, US

P
 PEZ Visitor Center, Orange, Connecticut, US
Ping Huang Coffee Museum, Taibao City, Taiwan
 Ping-Lin Tea Museum, New Taipei City, Taiwan
 Poli Grappa Museum, Bassano del Grappa, Italy
 Potato Museum, Albuquerque, New Mexico
 Potosi Brewery, Potosi, Wisconsin

R

 Redpath Sugar Refinery, Toronto, Ontario, Canada
 Riserva naturale integrale Saline di Trapani e Paceco, Province of Trapani, Italy
 Royal Saltworks at Arc-et-Senans, Arc-et-Senans, France

S

 SAB World of Beer, Johannesburg, South Africa
 Sally Lunn's House, Bath, England
 Sapporo Beer Museum, Sapporo, Japan
 Schimpff's Confectionery, Jeffersonville, Indiana 
 Schloss Esterházy Wine Museum, Eisenstadt, Austria
 Schloss Stainz, Stainz, Austria 
 Serbian Museum of Bread - Jeremija, Pećinci, Serbia 
 Shin-Yokohama Raumen Museum, Yokohama, Japan
 Small Carpathian Museum, Bratislava, Slovakia
 Southern Food and Beverage Museum, New Orleans, Louisiana
 Soya-Mixed Meat Museum, Kaohsiung, Taiwan
 Spam Museum, Austin, Minnesota
 Spring Onion Culture Museum, Yilan County, Taiwan
 Strataca, Hutchinson, Kansas, US
 Sugar Museum (Berlin)
 Sugar Museum, Tienen, Belgium

T

 Tabasco Museum, Louisiana, United States
 Taipei Story House, Taipei, Taiwan
 Taiwan Mochi Museum, Nantou County, Taiwan
 Taiwan Nougat Museum, New Taipei, Taiwan
 Taiwan Salt Museum, Tainan, Taiwan
 Taiwan Sugar Museum (Kaohsiung), Kaohsiung, Taiwan
 Taiwan Sugar Museum (Tainan)
 Tao Heung Foods of Mankind Museum
 Tenfu Tea Museum
 Teng Feng Fish Ball Museum, New Taipei, Taiwan
 The Hershey Story
 The Museum of the American Cocktail
 The Rum Story
 Theefabriek
 Tottori Nijisseiki Pear Museum
 Tteok & Kitchen Utensil Museum
 Twinings Museum

U
 Universal Exposition of Wines and Spirits
 Universalmuseum Joanneum

V
 Vajdahunyad Castle
 Vino Versum Poysdorf
 Vinseum – Catalan Wine Cultures Museum
 Museum of the History of Russian Vodka, Moscow, Russia

W

 Waffle House Museum, Decatur, Georgia
 Weaver Hall Museum and Workhouse, Northwich, Cheshire, England
 Wieliczka Salt Mine, Wieliczka, Poland
 Wine and Vine Museum (Naoussa)
 Wine Museum (Pleven)
 Wine Museum and Enoteca
 Witloofmuseum, Kampenhout, Belgium (obsolete)
 Wood Old Homestead
 World Carrot Museum online only
 World of Coca-Cola, Atlanta, Georgia
 Wu Tao Chishang Lunch Box Cultural History Museum
 Wyandot Popcorn Museum, Marion, Ohio, US

Y

 Yilan Distillery Chia Chi Lan Wine Museum, Yilan County, Taiwan
 Yokohama Curry Museum

Z
 Zaans Museum
 Zigong Salt History Museum
 Zupy krakowskie

See also
 Food history
 List of chocolate museums
 List of potato museums
 Wine Museum

References

External links
 

 
 
Lists of museums by subject
Museums